Union of Christian Families (ZchR) is minor Polish far-right nationalist and Catholic social conservative political party. Founded in 2015, it is led by former MEP Bogusław Rogalski. The party is part of the Confederation Liberty and Independence.

References

External links

2015 establishments in Poland
Eurosceptic parties in Poland
Political parties established in 2015
Right-wing populism in Poland
Anti-Islam political parties in Europe
National Democracy
Anti-Islam sentiment in Poland
Right-wing populist parties